Amy Sproston is an American ultramarathoner from Monmouth, Il.

She won the 2012 IAU 100 km World Championships.  Along with this she won a team title for the United States.

Sproston finished second at the 2016 Western States Endurance Run.  This was her fourth top-ten finish in the event.

References

Living people
1974 births
American female ultramarathon runners
Track and field athletes from Portland, Oregon
21st-century American women
Sportspeople from Illinois